Laurence Alexander Wolsey is an English mathematician working in the field of integer programming. He is a former president and research director of the Center for Operations Research and Econometrics (CORE) at Université catholique de Louvain in Belgium. He is professor emeritus of applied mathematics at the engineering school of the same university.

Early life and education
Wolsey received a MSc in Mathematics from Cambridge in 1966 and a Ph.D. in Mathematics from the Massachusetts Institute of Technology in 1969 under the supervision of Jeremy F. Shapiro.

Career

Wolsey was visiting researcher at the Manchester Business School in 1969–1971.

He was invited by George L. Nemhauser as a Post-Doctoral student to CORE in Belgium in 1971. He met his future wife, Marguerite Loute, sister of CORE colleague Etienne Loute, and settled in Belgium. He was later a visiting professor at the London School of Economics in 1978–1979, at Cornell University in 1983, at Ecole polytechnique de Lausanne in 1986–1987, and Donders professor at University of Utrecht in 1998.

Wolsey was the editor-in-chief of the Mathematical Programming journal from 1999 to 2003.

Research 
Wolsey has made seminal contributions in duality theory for integer programming, submodular optimization, the group-theoretic approach and polyhedral analysis of fixed-charge network flow and production planning models.

Awards and honours 
Wolsey has received the Beale-Orchard Hays Prize in 1988,  the Frederick W. Lanchester Prize in 1989, the EURO Gold Medal in 1994, the John von Neumann Theory Prize in 2012, and the Dantzig Prize in 2012.

The ORBEL Wolsey award is a Belgian prize recognizing the best and most significant OR implementation contributed to Open-Source during the year.

Selected publications 
 Integer and Combinatorial Optimization (with George L. Nemhauser, Wiley, 1988)
 Integer Programming (Wiley, 1998)
 Production Planning by Mixed Integer Programming (with Yves Pochet, Springer, 2006)

References

External links
Google Scholar report

INFORMS: Biography of Laurence Wolsey from the Institute for Operations Research and the Management Sciences

Year of birth missing (living people)
Living people
English mathematicians
Massachusetts Institute of Technology School of Science alumni
Academic staff of the Université catholique de Louvain
John von Neumann Theory Prize winners